Logan Alexander Paul (born April 1, 1995) is an American social media personality, actor, and professional wrestler. He is currently signed to WWE, where he performs on the Raw brand. He has over 23 million subscribers on his YouTube channel, and has ranked on the Forbes list for the highest paid YouTube creators in 2017, 2018, and 2021. Paul has also run the Impaulsive podcast since November 2018, which has over 4 million YouTube subscribers.

Paul gained a following in 2013, posting sketches on the now defunct video-sharing application Vine. He registered his YouTube channel, TheOfficialLoganPaul, on October 18, 2013, where he started posting regularly following the closure of the Vine app. He later created the Logan Paul Vlogs channel on August 29, 2015, which has since become his most-subscribed YouTube channel. As of January 2022, the channel has received 23.2 million subscribers and over 5.8 billion views, ranking as the 74th most-subscribed channel in the United States, and placing him among the most-subscribed channels on the platform.

As an actor, Paul's television and film work includes guest appearances on Law & Order: Special Victims Unit and Bizaardvark, and roles in films The Thinning (2016) and The Thinning: New World Order (2018). He has also explored other avenues; he released his debut single "2016" in 2016, and fought English media personality KSI in an amateur white-collar boxing match in 2018. The fight ended in a majority draw. In the 2019 rematch, which was a professional bout, KSI won by split decision. After a couple of brief appearances in WWE in 2021, he made his professional wrestling debut as The Miz's tag team partner in a tag team match at WrestleMania 38 in April 2022, which they won and Paul received praise for his performance. He then signed a multi-event contract with WWE in June that year and has since performed at events such as SummerSlam, in which he defeated The Miz in his debut singles match, and Crown Jewel, in which he lost to Undisputed WWE Universal Champion Roman Reigns in the main event. His next match is scheduled for WrestleMania 39 against Seth "Freakin" Rollins.

Paul has been involved in several controversies, most notably in relation to a trip to Japan in December 2017, during which he visited the Aokigahara forest, otherwise known as "suicide forest", and filmed the corpse of a suicide victim, and uploaded the footage to his YouTube channel.

On July 22, 2021, Paul bought what is considered to be the rarest Pokémon card in the world, a PSA 10 1998 Pikachu Illustrator Card from Marwan Dubsy in Dubai for $5.275 million.

Early life
Logan Alexander Paul was born in Westlake, Ohio, on April 1, 1995, the son of Pamela Stepnick and Gregory Paul. He has English, Irish, Scottish, Welsh, Jewish, French and German ancestry. He grew up in Westlake with younger brother Jake (born 1997), who is also a media personality. Paul began creating videos for a YouTube channel called Zoosh when he was 10 years old. He attended Westlake High School, achieving the ranks of The Plain Dealer's All-Star linebacker on the football team in 2012, and qualifying for the state-level Ohio High School Athletic Association 2013 Division I Wrestling Individual Championships.

YouTube career

2015–2017: YouTube beginnings
By the time Paul attended college, his YouTube channel had attained a modest following via the platform Vine. He majored in Industrial Engineering at Ohio University before dropping out in 2014 to pursue a career as a full-time social media entertainer in Los Angeles, moving into an apartment complex in Los Angeles with other Vine stars.

Paul rose to fame as a member on the Internet video sharing service Vine. In February 2014, he had over 3.1 million followers on various social media platforms. By April 2014 he had attained 105,000 Twitter followers, 361,000 Instagram followers, 31,000 likes on his Facebook page and about 150,000 subscribers to his YouTube channel. A YouTube compilation video of his Vine work garnered more than four million views the first week it was posted. In 2015 he was ranked as the 10th most influential figure on Vine, with his six-second videos earning him hundreds of thousands of dollars in advertising revenue. By that October, his Facebook videos alone had more than 300 million views. 
Logan refers to his following as "Logang", which is a portmanteau between his first name and "gang".

In early 2015, Paul appeared on Law & Order: Special Victims Unit. He also appeared on the Fox TV series Weird Loners, where he appeared in the role of the Paul Twins. He starred in two episodes of the Freeform series Stitchers. In 2016, he starred in the YouTube Red movie The Thinning opposite Peyton List. In early 2016, Paul trained with drama coaches and the comedy troupes The Groundlings and Upright Citizens Brigade. Paul wrote the screenplay for an adult comedy, Airplane Mode, which has been described as "American Pie for Gen Z", and by Paul himself as "Expendables with Internet stars". The film was originally planned to be released in 2017, but was eventually released on August 2, 2019, after being delayed. He was also involved in a number of advertising campaigns, including for Hanes, PepsiCo, and HBO. In 2016, Comcast purchased a short form digital TV series from Paul called Logan Paul VS.

In February 2017, Dwayne Johnson released on his own YouTube channel, "Logan Paul has been cut from, like, all of The Rock's movies", a video starring himself and Paul, in which Johnson informs Paul that he has been cut from all of Johnson's films, and consoles Paul by making him the "ambassador" to his upcoming Baywatch feature film. On November 23, 2017, Paul released his new single, "No Handlebars", a track that draws heavily on an interpolated sample of the song "Handlebars" by the American alternative hip hop group Flobots. The song was heavily criticized for its perceived sexual objectification of women, including a scene in its music video where Paul rides several women like a bicycle. Flobots frontman Jamie Laurie lambasted Paul for both the "sexist" lyrical content of the song and for unauthorized use of the sample, calling him the face of "douchebag entitlement". Laurie would later go on to release a track with lyrics deriding Paul, titled "Handle Your Bars". Paul did not respond to Laurie's comments nor the backlash towards "No Handlebars". After Flobots sued Paul for copyright infringement in 2019, he deleted the song from YouTube.

2017–2018: Suicide forest controversy

On December 31, 2017, Paul uploaded a vlog to his YouTube channel depicting the recently deceased corpse of a man who had died by hanging himself in Aokigahara at the base of Mount Fuji in Japan, known as the "suicide forest" due to its infamy as a suicide site. Initially intended to be part three of his "Tokyo Adventures" series, Paul and his group had planned to camp in the woods, but in response to finding the corpse, decided to notify the authorities and cancel their plans. The video gained 6.3 million views within 24 hours of being uploaded. Paul's video depicting the corpse and his group's reactions to it were criticized by celebrities and politicians. In addition, he was accused by other members of the YouTube community of being insensitive to suicide victims. He was also criticized for other misbehavior he was captured taking part in during the trip, including climbing onto a moving forklift at the Tsukiji fish market, removing his clothing on a crowded street, then proceeding to fight with one of the people he was traveling with, and throwing a giant Poké Ball at passing citizens, including an officer of the Tokyo Metropolitan Police Department. Several petitions were made to Change.org urging YouTube to delete Paul's channel, the largest of which received more than 720,000 signatures as of February 9, 2018.

As a result of the backlash, Paul removed the video from his YouTube channel, following up with a written apology on Twitter on January 1, 2018. The following day, on January 2, a subsequent video apology was released to YouTube in which Paul admits he made a "severe and continuous lapse in [his] judgement" and describes his behavior as a "coping mechanism", asking his fans to stop defending his actions in the process. On January 9, YouTube issued a statement via their Twitter account condemning Paul's video. In the series of tweets, they said, "It's taken us a long time to respond, but we've been listening to everything you've been saying. We know that the actions of one creator can affect the entire community, so we'll have more to share soon on steps we're taking to ensure a video like this is never circulated again." On January 10, YouTube announced it was removing Paul's channels from Google Preferred, its preferred ad program, and New World Order, the sequel to his YouTube film The Thinning, was placed on hold, with the airing of Logan Paul VS. being halted as well. He was also cut from season 4 of the YouTube Red series Foursome and the role of Alec Fixler was terminated. Metro-Goldwyn-Mayer also pulled from the schedule the release of the musical film Valley Girl in which Paul plays Mickey Bowen, following the controversies. On January 15, Paul was seen at LAX by reporters from TMZ. He said that he has learned a lot from his mistakes and believes he has been treated "fairly". When asked whether or not he deserves a second chance, Paul replied, "Everyone deserves second chances, bro." In response, he donated $1 million to suicide prevention agencies, a quarter of which is going to the National Suicide Prevention Lifeline. In response to the controversy, Paul hired Mike Majlak, a former Marketing Manager at furniture company LoveSac, to "make sure that no bad things happen" and work with Logan to help improve his reputation. On February 4, Paul officially returned to his daily vlogs on YouTube after taking a 3-week-long hiatus. YouTube CEO Susan Wojcicki said on February 12 that Paul did not violate YouTube's three-strike policy and did not meet the criteria for being banned from the platform. In the wake of the controversy regarding the suicide video, Maverick Apparel, a brand for juniors and children, threatened Paul with legal action for giving his clothing line a similar name ("Maverick by Logan Paul"), believing shoppers are confusing their line with Paul's, resulting in a deep decline in sales.

2018–present: Boxing, podcast, and further controversies
On February 9, 2018, YouTube suspended all advertising on Paul's channels due to his "pattern of behavior", referring to a joke he tweeted about the Tide Pod challenge, removing a fish from his pond to "jokingly give it CPR", and tasering two dead rats. His revenue was temporarily halted as a result, and as a result of the suspension, he broadcast live on Twitch for the first time. Two weeks later, on February 26, YouTube restored ads on Paul's channel; however, his channel was still on a 90-day "probation period" during which time content from his channel was not eligible to be on YouTube's trending tab.

On November 20, 2018, the first episode of Impaulsive was aired. In January 2019, Paul remarked on his Impaulsive podcast, "What is it, male-only March? We're gonna attempt to go gay for just one month." He received widespread criticism for implying that being gay is a choice, with LGBTQ+ organization GLAAD responding to Paul's statement on Twitter, writing, "That's not how it works, Logan Paul." In March 2019, Paul released what has been described as a mockumentary exploring the Flat Earth Theory. In the video, he interviewed many self-proclaimed "Flat Earthers", and spoke at the 2018 Flat Earth International Conference, which took place in Denver, Colorado. Logan Paul was sued by Planeless Pictures in December 2020 for the aforementioned 2017 incident in Aokigahara, when he posted a video including a recently deceased suicide victim. Planeless Pictures accused him of posting the video in order to escape a movie deal he had with them where he would star in, write, and produce their film Airplane Mode. They also claimed that the video led to Google suspending their contract with them, leaving them $3 million in debt. In 2021, Paul competed on the fifth season of The Masked Singer as "Grandpa Monster". He was unmasked after his second appearance where one of his clues was a foreshadowing of his boxing match against Floyd Mayweather Jr.

In September 2021, Paul released a NFT-based game called Cryptozoo, which he claimed that he had been working on for six months. The game was mocked for featuring stock images, and it was not well-received. In December 2022, Coffeezilla, a YouTuber who exposes cryptocurrency scams, ran a three-part docuseries on his YouTube channel about how the game was not functional despite the fact that millions of dollars of funding had been raised from investors. Criticism included marketing the game towards children, launching the game several months before the announcement and allowing the team to purchase large amounts of cryptocurrency which inflated its value. Paul later released a video disputing the allegations and threatened legal action against Coffeezilla but refused to elaborate on the legal and development issues of CryptoZoo. The response video was later deleted by Paul. He later apologized.

Paul was further criticised in January, 2023, when his former pet pig, named "Pearl", was found abandoned by The Gentle Barn Sanctuary in California, USA. Rescuers said she was "lucky to be alive" after being diagnosed with a potentially life-threatening uterus infection, which they said has since healed. Despite facing online criticism, Paul denied any wrongdoing, stating that he responsibly rehomed the pig in 2021 when he moved to Puerto Rico, and that the pig was subsequently rehomed again unbeknown to him at a later date.

Boxing career

Amateur career

KSI vs. Logan Paul 

On February 3, 2018, following his white collar amateur boxing match with Joe Weller, British YouTuber KSI challenged Paul to a boxing match. On February 24, 2018, it was announced that Paul and his brother would be fighting KSI and his younger brother, Deji, in two white-collar boxing matches. The fight ended as a majority draw, with two judges scoring the fight even at 57–57 and a third judge scoring 58–57 in favor of KSI.

Professional career

KSI vs. Logan Paul II 

On September 4, 2019, it was announced that Paul would be making his professional boxing debut in a rematch against KSI, which would be broadcast exclusively on DAZN in the United States. The fight was scheduled to take place on November 9 at the Staples Center. At the UK press conference for the rematch, Paul again stirred controversy as he accused KSI of having five abortions, before remarking, "Five babies dead. I might return the favor and kill you." He received criticism from abortion rights activists, who described his comment as "horrific", while anti-abortion activists came to his defense. Paul responded by stating, "I said something distasteful and insensitive."

The rematch, which consisted of six three minute rounds, resulted in a win for KSI via split decision, with two judges scoring the fight 57–54 and 56–55 for KSI, and one judge scoring it 56–55 in favor of Paul.

Exhibition bout

Mayweather vs. Paul

On December 6, 2020, it was announced that Paul would face former five-division world champion Floyd Mayweather Jr. in an exhibition bout on February 20, 2021. The fight was postponed, and took place on June 6, 2021, at Hard Rock Stadium in Miami Gardens, Florida. On May 6, 2021, Mayweather and Paul met for the first time at a press conference at Hard Rock Stadium, where the latter's brother, Jake Paul, became involved in an angry brawl with Mayweather when he removed Mayweather's hat from his head. A visibly irate Mayweather was captured on video saying, "I'll kill you motherfucker! Are you crazy? I'll fuck you up, motherfucker. I don't play motherfucking games. I'll fuck you up."

The bout consisted of constant clinching initiated by Paul and went the full distance to the sound of boos from the crowd, with no winner being announced. Mayweather's superior boxing was reflected by the CompuBox punch stats, with Mayweather having landed 43 punches of 107 thrown (40.2%), compared to Paul's 28 landed of 217 thrown (12.9%).

In his post-fight interview, Mayweather praised his opponent, saying: "He's better than I thought he was ... he's a tough, rough competitor." Paul appeared to harbor some doubt about how seriously Mayweather had taken the fight, saying: "I'm going to go home thinking, 'Did Floyd let me survive?

Boxing record

Professional

Exhibition

Amateur

Professional wrestling career 

On the April 2, 2021, episode of WWE SmackDown, Paul made his WWE debut, as a guest of Sami Zayn for his red carpet premiere of his documentary, with Zayn later inviting Paul to be at ringside for his match at WrestleMania 37 against Kevin Owens. At the event, after Owens defeated Zayn, Paul celebrated with Owens, before being hit with the Stunner by Owens. On the September 3 episode of SmackDown, Paul returned to WWE as Happy Corbin's special guest on The KO Show, where Paul helped Corbin attack Kevin Owens.

On the February 21, 2022, episode of WWE Raw, it was revealed that Paul was The Miz's tag team partner to take on Rey Mysterio and Dominik Mysterio at WrestleMania 38. At the event, Paul and Miz defeated the Mysterios; however, after the match, Miz attacked Paul.

On June 30, 2022, Paul signed a multi-event contract with WWE. At SummerSlam, Paul defeated The Miz. Paul then challenged Roman Reigns on the September 16 episode of SmackDown, and the two faced each other at Crown Jewel on November 5 for Reigns' Undisputed WWE Universal Championship (the umbrella term for both the WWE Championship and WWE Universal Championship being held and defended together). Paul was unsuccessful in defeating Reigns, despite interference from his Impaulsive entourage and his brother Jake, marking his first loss in WWE in what was only his third match. The match against Reigns received universal acclaim, with critics highly praising Paul's impressive wrestling skills. It was initially reported that Paul had suffered a torn meniscus, MCL, and ACL during the match, however, it was later revealed that Paul had only sprained his meniscus and MCL. On January 28, 2023, Paul made his return from injury at the Royal Rumble at #29, eliminating Seth "Freakin" Rollins before he was eliminated by the eventual winner Cody Rhodes. At Elimination Chamber on February 18, Paul snuck into the Elimination Chamber match and cost Rollins the United States Championship. On the March 6 episode of Raw, a match between Paul and Rollins was scheduled for WrestleMania 39.

Personal life
In October 2015, Paul lived in the same apartment complex on Hollywood and Vine in Hollywood, California as other social media celebrities including Amanda Cerny, Juanpa Zurita, and Andrew Bachelor, with his roommates Mark Dohner and Evan Eckenrode. This proximity facilitated various collaborations on their respective videos. In October 2017, Paul and Eckenrode relocated to an estate in Encino, California. In episode 198 of Impaulsive with guest Carl Lentz, who was pastor of Hillsong Church NYC at the time, Paul discussed religion, and described himself as "not overly religious". Paul also said that he was a Christian. He specified that he believes in a "creator", but he does not know what this creator's role would be in human's lives. The episode garnered mockery toward Paul, who initially claimed that Jews believe in Jesus as their god, before being corrected. In February 2021, Paul announced that he would be moving to Dorado, Puerto Rico from Los Angeles. He stated that the high taxes in California were the main motivator for the move. As of June 2021, he was living there in a $13 million mansion.

Health
Paul revealed in an episode of Impaulsive that he tore the cartilage in his knee from a football injury that required him to stay out of school for 3 months. In February 2019, Paul said that he has long-term brain damage, which he sustained from playing high school football. He stated that Daniel Amen, the doctor who diagnosed him, says it affects his ability to have empathy and a human connection with others. When filming a video for his Vine channel in 2014, Paul attempted a stunt during which he landed on a chair and damaged his right testicle.

Pay-per-view bouts

Filmography

Film

Television

Web

Podcast

Video games

Discography

Singles

Promotional singles

Guest appearances

Awards and nominations

References

External links

 
 
 

 Logan Paul
1995 births
Living people
21st-century American male actors
American male film actors
American male television actors
American podcasters
American people of English descent
American people of German-Jewish descent
American people of Irish descent
American people of Scottish descent
American people of Welsh descent
American YouTubers
Comedy YouTubers
Controversies in Japan
Internet-related controversies
Male actors from Ohio
Male bloggers
Mass media people from Ohio
Music YouTubers
Ohio University alumni
Suicide and the Internet
Vine (service) celebrities
YouTube controversies
YouTube podcasters
YouTube vloggers
YouTube boxers
People from Westlake, Ohio
21st-century professional wrestlers
Professional wrestlers from Ohio